Cephas Cooper (born 11 July 1999) is a Trinidadian cricketer. He made his List A debut for West Indies B in the 2018–19 Regional Super50 tournament on 11 October 2018. Prior to his List A debut, he was named in the West Indies' squad for the 2018 Under-19 Cricket World Cup. He made his first-class debut on 5 March 2020, for Trinidad and Tobago in the 2019–20 West Indies Championship.

References

External links
 

1999 births
Living people
Trinidad and Tobago cricketers
West Indies B cricketers
Place of birth missing (living people)